Lyle Rains was a senior executive at the arcade game company Atari and is sometimes, with Ed Logg, listed as a co-developer of the video game Asteroids. In fact, Rains called Logg into his office and said "Well, why don’t we have a game where you shoot the rocks and blow them up?". Rains also served as Executive Producer for a large number of Atari coin-op games. An avid gamer, he wrote a popular online FAQ for the Atari coin-op game KLAX.

He joined old compatriot video game designers in a new company called Innovative Leisure headed by Seamus Blackley in 2012 to design games for phones.

Game credits
Tank (1974)
Jet Fighter (1975)
Steeplechase (1975)
Sprint 2 (1976) - also credited with designing the well-known 'Atari arcade font'.
Sprint 4 (1977)
Atari Football (1978)
Sky Raider (1978) - game designer
Asteroids (1979)
Hard Drivin' (1988)
Race Drivin' (1990)
Space Lords (1992)

References

External links
 History of Atari's Asteroids
 Article at The Dot Eaters, on Rains and the development of Asteroids
 Lyle Rains at Arcade-History.com

Year of birth missing (living people)
Living people
Video game designers